The 1987–88 Arkansas Razorbacks men's basketball team represented the University of Arkansas in the 1987–88 college basketball season. The head coach was Nolan Richardson, serving for his third year. The team played its home games in Barnhill Arena in Fayetteville, Arkansas.

Roster

Schedule and results

|-
!colspan=9 style=| Exhibition Season

|-
!colspan=9 style=| Non-Conference Regular Season

|-
!colspan=9 style=| SWC Regular Season

|-
!colspan=9 style=| SWC tournament

|-
!colspan=9 style=| NCAA tournament

Sources

Rankings

References

Arkansas
Arkansas
Arkansas Razorbacks men's basketball seasons
Razor
Razor